Jerrold Pete Mangliwan (born 17 October 1979) is a Filipino wheelchair racer who competed for the Philippines in the 2014 Asian Para Games and the 2016 Summer Paralympics. In wheelchair racing, he competes in the T52 classification.

Mangliwan has paraplegia which he acquired from polio, a disease he was diagnosed of when he was two years old. He took up the sport of wheelchair racing in 2009 upon the encouragement of a friend.

At the 2015 ASEAN Para Games, he won gold medals at the 100m and 200m T52 race, and a silver in the 400m T52 race.

References

External links 
 

1979 births
Living people
Athletes (track and field) at the 2016 Summer Paralympics
ASEAN ParaGames competitors
Paralympic track and field athletes of the Philippines
Athletes (track and field) at the 2020 Summer Paralympics